Kita is a town and urban commune in western Mali.  The town is the capital of the Kita Cercle in the Kayes Region. It lies on the eastern slope of Mount Kita (Bambara: "Kita-kulu"), known for its caves and rock paintings.  Today, the town is known for its music, its annual Roman Catholic pilgrimage and its role as a processing center for the surrounding cotton- and peanut-growing region.  Kita lies on the Dakar-Niger Railway and is the largest transit hub between Bamako (112 miles) and Kayes (205 miles). In the 2018 census the urban commune had a population of 463,787.

In November 1955, Kita became a commune of average exercise. On March 2, 1966, Kita became a commune of full exercise. The town grew in the 1990s around the cotton industry, but this has since declined.

A fictionalized version of Kita features as the setting for Malian author Massa Makan Diabaté's "Kouta Trilogy" (Le lieutenant de Kouta, Le coiffeur de Kouta, and Le boucher de Kouta).

History

Name 
Kita proper has been called with different names throughout history. One of its earliest names was "Guénou Kourou".

However, a second name "Sediousaba" had been used for the small village, or rather an area in the town.

Birth & Settlements 
Two major settlements have been considered the birth of the town of Kita, however the order of these settlements are still subjects to debate. One of the settlements was attributed to the Tounkara traders from Ouagadou, the Ghana empire. Their chief, Diouna Tounkara, created "Sediousaba", which means "Three shea trees" as mentioned above. The second settlement was attributed to a Guinea trader, Siema Toloba Kamara, who created a village called "Fatali. Later, Siema Toloba Kamara and Diouna Tounkara allied with each other to form a new village called "Linguékoto".

Population 
In the Health Minister's 2018 census, Kita had a population of 463,787, while in 2020, the urban area of Kita counted 65,908.

Climate
Kita has a fairly dry tropical savanna climate (Köppen Aw) with a hot to sweltering and arid dry season from November to late May and a hot, steamy wet season from late May to October.

Notable residents
 Sekou Koita, International Soccer player
 Bako Dagnon, female griot
 Cheick Hamala Diabate, griot and Afropop musician
 Mamadou Diabate, master kora player
 Massa Makan Diabaté, historian, author, and playwright
 Kandia Kouyaté, musician
 Djelimady Tounkara, musician and one of the foremost guitarists in Africa

See also

 Railway stations in Mali

References

External links
 .

Communes of Kayes Region